Angut-e Gharbi Rural District is in the Central District of Ungut County, Ardabil province, Iran. Prior to the formation of the county, the rural district was in Angut District of Germi County. At the census of 2006, its population was 12,806 in 2,585 households; there were 11,855 inhabitants in 2,920 households at the following census of 2011; and in the most recent census of 2016, the population of the rural district was 10,721 in 2,953 households. The largest of its 86 villages was Ziveh, with 1,412 people.

References 

Rural Districts of Ardabil Province

Populated places in Ardabil Province